Dark Ride is a 2006 American slasher film directed by Craig Singer and written by Singer and Robert Dean Klein. It was selected to play at the "8 Films To Die For" film festival, as one of the first eight films to be featured in the festival's series. The film revolves around a group of friends who are terrorized by a crazy masked murderer at a dark ride in Asbury Park.

Plot

Twin teenage girls, Sam and Colleen, enter the mysterious Dark Ride. Sam, who is tough and competitive, gets annoyed at Colleen because she is anxious and scared. The killer kidnaps Sam and slices her stomach, then brutally kills Colleen.

Ten years later, Cathy (Jamie-Lynn Sigler) and Liz (Jennifer Tisdale) are getting ready for spring break. They decide to take a road trip along with three of their male friends, Bill (Patrick Renna), Steve (David Clayton Rogers), and Jim (Alex Solowitz). The friends embark together in Jim's van, and meet a hitchhiker named Jen (Andrea Bogart). While at a gas station, Bill wanders around trying to find the bathroom. When he rejoins the others, he claims to have found a pamphlet about the Dark Ride re-opening after many years of being closed. The group decides to make a detour to the amusement park and spend the night in the Dark Ride attraction. Once they arrive, Cathy decides to stay in the van while the others go into the ride. Unbeknownst to them, the killer, named Jonah (Dave Warden), has escaped from a mental hospital after killing two orderlies.

Liz, Steve, Jim, and Jen find a door inside. Jim switches on the power, which illuminates the lights and launches the ride, as well as its scary theatrical effects. The four then sit and smoke marijuana. Bill tells them about the two girls that were killed ten years earlier and reveals that they were his cousins. After some initial skepticism, the others eventually believe him. Jen and Steve wander into the hallway to fool around. Jen sees something and notices Cathy's fake corpse sitting in a chair with her throat slashed. The prank was meant to be pulled on Steve, who is livid due to the trauma. Cathy argues with him, and they both stop fighting when Bill breaks it up. Steve, angry about the prank, wanders off by himself.

The others are moving along when the power goes out. Jim goes to the basement to fix it, and Jen follows him down and starts fellating him. Jonah slides through a hidden entrance on the floor and cuts off Jen's head. Jim tries to run but hits his head on a pipe and knocks himself out. Meanwhile, Liz, Cathy, and Bill start trying to find their way out of the ride when they stumble upon Steve's mutilated corpse. Frightened, the girls run one way, and Bill goes another.

After Cathy finds Liz's body, a policeman arrives and tries to help her, but Jonah slashes his head in half with a machete. Cathy jumps out of an opening and gets into the van. Jonah attacks Jim with a hook, but Cathy drives the van into the building, impaling Jonah on a wall of spikes, killing him and causing her to pass out. Bill appears and reveals that he and Jonah are brothers and stabs Jim. Bill thanks Cathy, who runs out of the Dark Ride and falls to her knees as she hears sirens approaching. The film ends showing what appears to be Bill wearing Jonah's mask.

Production and release

Filming began 25 October 2004 and finished 19 November 2004. The film saw a limited release on November 17, 2006 at the After Dark Horrorfest, an event in which movies "too graphic" for theaters are finally shown to the public for one weekend only, across several states in the US.

The DVD was released on March 27, 2007.

Cast

 Jamie-Lynn Sigler as Cathy
 Patrick Renna as Bill
 Jennifer Tisdale as Liz
 David Clayton Rogers as Steve
 Alex Solowitz as Jim
 Andrea Bogart as Jen
 Brittany Coyle as Colleen
 Chelsea Coyle as Samantha
 David Warden as Jonah
 Jim Williams as Ticket Taker
 Erin Dawson as Hippie
 Jack Doner as Old Man
 David Ury as Attendant #1
 Atticus Todd as Attendant #2
 Steve Mattila as Homeless Man
 Damon Standifer as Reggie
 Julie Bickel as Teen Female #1
 Jessica Lobaina as Teen Female #2

External links 
 
 

Lionsgate films
2006 films
American slasher films
2006 horror films
American serial killer films
2000s slasher films
Films set in amusement parks
2000s English-language films
2000s American films